Talopram (Lu 3-010), also known as phthalapromine, is a selective norepinephrine reuptake inhibitor (NRI) which was researched for the management of depression in the 1960s and 1970s but was never commercialized. Along with talsupram, talopram is structurally related to the selective serotonin reuptake inhibitor (SSRI) citalopram, as well as to melitracen:

Synthesis
An unexpected/fortuitous rearrangement product in the synthesis of litracen is what led to talopram.

See also 
Talsupram (tasulopram)
Amedalin
Daledalin
, 1969 (#15).
Original literature
Prindamine (21489-22-5)

References 

Antidepressants
Norepinephrine reuptake inhibitors
Isobenzofurans